Miosurnia (meaning "Miocene Surnia") is an extinct genus of surniin bird from the Late Miocene Liushu Formation of Gansu Province, China. The genus contains a single species, Miosurnia diurna, known from a nearly complete, articulated skeleton.

Discovery and naming 
The Miosurnia holotype specimen, STM 20-1, was discovered in a layer of the Liushu Formation in the Linxia Basin of Gansu Province, China. The specimen is articulated and nearly complete, lacking only the right forelimb and left manual digits.

In 2022, Li et al. published a paper analyzing the evolution of diurnalism in owls beginning in the late Miocene, and described Miosurnia diurna, a new genus and species of strigid. The generic name, "Miosurnia", references the Miocene age of the holotype specimen as well as the close relation of the genus to Surnia. The specific name, "diurna", refers to the diurnalism inferred for the animal.

Description 

Classification 
In their phylogenetic analyses, Li et al. (2022) recovered Miosurnia as a member of the Surniini and sister taxon to Surnia + Glaucidium. All members of this clade are diurnal.

References 

Strigidae
Extinct birds of Asia
Prehistoric bird genera
Fossil taxa described in 2022
Birds described in 2022